Ave verum corpus (Hail, true body), (K. 618), is a motet in D major composed by Wolfgang Amadeus Mozart in 1791. It is a setting of the Latin hymn Ave verum corpus. Mozart wrote it for Anton Stoll, a friend who was the church musician of St. Stephan in Baden bei Wien. The motet was composed for the feast of Corpus Christi; the autograph is dated 17 June 1791. It is scored for SATB choir, string instruments and organ.

History 

Mozart composed the motet in 1791 in the middle of writing his opera Die Zauberflöte. He wrote it while visiting his wife Constanze, who was pregnant with their sixth child and staying in the spa Baden bei Wien. Mozart set the 14th century Eucharistic hymn in Latin "Ave verum corpus". He wrote the motet for Anton Stoll, a friend of his . Stoll was the musical director of the parish St. Stephan, Baden. The setting was composed to celebrate the feast of Corpus Christi; the autograph is dated 17 June 1791. (The Feast of Corpus Christi falls on the Thursday following Trinity Sunday, and in 1791 was observed on June 23.) The composition is only forty-six bars long and is scored for SATB choir, string instruments, and organ. Mozart's manuscript contains minimal directions, with only a single sotto voce marking at the beginning.

The motet was composed less than six months before Mozart's death. It foreshadows "aspects of the Requiem such as declamatory gesture, textures, and integration of forward- and backward-looking stylistic elements". While the Requiem is a dramatic composition, the motet expresses the Eucharistic thoughts with simple means, suited for the church choir in a small town.

Franz Liszt made transcriptions of Mozart's motet for piano solo [Searle 461a] and for organ [Searle 674d], and also quoted Mozart in his fantasie piece Evocation à la Chapelle Sixtine [Searle 461], in versions for piano, organ, orchestra, and piano duet. Pyotr Ilyich Tchaikovsky incorporates an orchestration of Liszt's transcription in his fourth orchestral suite, Mozartiana, Op. 61, a tribute to Mozart's music.

Melody 

The beginning of the melody is as follows:

Discography
 On Great Mass in C minor, K. 427 (Leonard Bernstein film), Bavarian Radio Symphony Orchestra and Chorus, conducted by Leonard Bernstein, Deutsche Grammophon CD 431-791-2 (1991) and DVD 00440-073-4240 (2006)

References

External links 

 
 Paged score synchronized with audio, Digital Mozart score Viewer (MoVi), Digital Mozart Edition
 
 

Compositions by Wolfgang Amadeus Mozart
Motets
1791 compositions
Compositions in D major